tert-Butylamine''' is an organic chemical compound with the formula (CH3)3CNH2.  It is a colorless liquid with a typical amine-like odor.  tert-Butylamine is one of the four isomeric amines of butane, the others being n-butylamine, sec-butylamine and isobutylamine.

Preparationtert-Butylamine is produced commercially by direct amination of isobutylene using zeolite catalysts:
NH3  +  CH2=C(CH3)2  →   H2NC(CH3)3
The Ritter reaction of isobutene with hydrogen cyanide is not useful because it produces too much waste.

(CH3)2C=CH2  +  HCN  +  H2O   →   (CH3)3CNHCHO
(CH3)3CNHCHO  +  H2O   →   (CH3)3CNH2  +  HCO2H

In the laboratory, it can be prepared by the hydrogenolysis of 2,2-dimethylethylenimine, or via tert-butylphthalimide.<ref>{{cite journal | title = tert'-Butylamine | author = Kenneth N. Campbell, Armiger H. Sommers, Barbara K. Campbell | journal = Organic Syntheses | volume = 47 | pages = 12 | year = 1947|doi=10.15227/orgsyn.027.0012}}</ref>

Uses
tert-Butylamine is used as an intermediate in the preparation of the sulfenamides such as N-tert-butyl-2-benzothiazylsulfenamide and N-tert-butyl-2-benzothiazylsulfenimide. As rubber accelerators, these compounds modify the rate of vulcanization of rubber. A variety of pesticides are derived from this amine, including terbacil, terbutryn, and terbumeton.

In pharmacology under the name erbumine''', tert''-butylamine has been used as a counterion in drug substances such as perindopril erbumine.

See also
 Borane tert-butylamine complex

References

Alkylamines
Tert-butyl compounds